Emily Rolfe Grosholz (born 1950 Philadelphia) is an American poet and philosopher. She is Edwin Erle Sparks Professor of Philosophy, African American Studies and English, and a member of the Center for Fundamental Theory / Institute for Gravitation and the Cosmos, at the Pennsylvania State University.

She was the 2011 Elizabeth McNulty Wilkinson '25 Poetry Chair, at Buffalo Seminary in March 2011.

From September 2011 through January 2012, she was a senior researcher at REHSEIS / SPHERE / CNRS and University of Paris Diderot - Paris 7, with a 'Research in Paris 2011' grant from the city of Paris.

Life
She was raised in the suburbs of Philadelphia. She graduated from the University of Chicago, with a B.A. in 1972, and Yale University with a Ph.D. in Philosophy in 1978.

She was a 1988 Guggenheim Fellow. She held National Endowment for the Humanities fellowships in 1985 and in 2004, and American Council of Learned Societies fellowships in 1982 and 1997.

She has served as an advisory editor for the Hudson Review since 1984. She has been a member of the editorial board of the Journal of the History of Ideas since 1998, a member of the editorial board of Studia Leibnitiana since 2002, and a member of the editorial board of the Journal of Humanistic Mathematics since 2010. She is a member of the Directive Committee of the Association for the Philosophy of Mathematical Practice.

She is married to the medievalist Robert R. Edwards, with whom she has four children.

Works

Autobiography/Essay
Great Circles, Springer, 2018,   (eBook)

Poetry
The River Painter, University of Illinois Press, 1984, 
Shores and Headlands, Princeton University Press, 1988, 
Eden, Johns Hopkins University Press, 1992, 

Feuilles; Huit poèmes: Edition bilingue français-anglais, with Farhad Ostovani, William Blake And Co, 2009, 
Beginning and End of the Snow, Bucknell University Press, 2012,  (English Translation of Yves Bonnefoy Debut et fin de la Neige, Mercure de France; with drawings by Farhad Ostovani)
Proportions of the Heart: Poems that Play with Mathematics, Tessellations Publishing, 2014,  (with mathematical artwork by Robert Fathauer)
Childhood, Accents Publishing, 2014,  (with drawings by Lucy Vines), translated to Yoruba language in 2021 by Kola Tubosun
The Stars of Earth: New and Selected Poems, Word Galaxy Press, 2017,

Philosophy
Cartesian Method and the Problem of Reduction (1991) Oxford University Press 

Representation and Productive Ambiguity in Mathematics and the Sciences,Oxford University Press, 2007, 
"The Humanism of Ernst Cassirer", Hudson Review
Starry Reckoning: Reference and Analysis in Mathematics and Cosmology (2016) Springer Verlag, SAPERE. In Studies in Applied Philosophy, Epistemology and Rational Ethics Series (edited by Lorenzo Magnani).
"Was Leibniz a mathematical revolutionary?", pages 117 to 133 of Revolutions in Mathematics (1992) Gillies editor, Oxford University Press.

Editor

Emily Grosholz, James Stewart and Bernard Bell (Eds), W. E. B. Du Bois on Race and Culture, Routledge, 1996, 
Emily Grosholz (Ed), Telling the Barn Swallow: Poets on the Poetry of Maxine Kumin,  University Press of New England, 1997, 
Emily Grosholz and Herbert Breger (Eds), The Growth of Mathematical Knowledge, Kluwer, 1999, 
Emily Grosholz (Ed), The Legacy of Simone de Beauvoir, Oxford University Press, 2004 / 2008, 
Emily Grosholz, Carlo Cellucci and Emiliano Ippoliti (Eds), Logic and Knowledge, Cambridge Scholars Publishing, 2011, 
Emily Grosholz (Ed), Studia Leibnitiana, Band 44, Heft 1 (2012), Franz Steiner Verlag, ISSN 0039-3185 (Special issue on Leibniz, Time and History)

References

External links
"Emily Grosholz Interview", Southern Bookman
"Crossing the Canal St. Martin"

Writers from Philadelphia
University of Chicago alumni
Yale University alumni
Living people
1950 births
American women poets
21st-century American women